This is a list of the Chinese era names used by the various dynasties and regimes in the history of China, sorted by monarch.

The English renditions of the era names in this list are based on the Hanyu Pinyin system. However, some academic works utilize the Wade–Giles romanization. For instance, the era of Zhenguan during the reign of the Emperor Taizong of Tang is rendered as Chen-kuan in Wade–Giles.

Han dynasty

Western Han

Xin dynasty

Xuan Han

Eastern Han

Other regimes contemporaneous with Han dynasty

Three Kingdoms

Cao Wei

Shu Han

Eastern Wu

Other regimes contemporaneous with Three Kingdoms

Jin dynasty

Western Jin

Eastern Jin

Huan Chu

Other regimes contemporaneous with Jin dynasty

Sixteen Kingdoms

Han Zhao

Cheng Han

Later Zhao

Former Liang

Former Yan

Former Qin

Later Yan

Later Qin

Western Qin

Later Liang

Southern Liang

Northern Liang

Southern Yan

Western Liang

Hu Xia

Northern Yan

Dai

Ran Wei

Western Yan

Zhai Wei

Other regimes contemporaneous with Sixteen Kingdoms

Northern and Southern dynasties

Northern Wei

Eastern Wei

Western Wei

Northern Qi

Northern Zhou

Liu Song

Southern Qi

Liang dynasty

Western Liang

Chen dynasty

Gaogouli

Rouran Khaganate

Later Chouchi

Gaochang

Hou Han

Other regimes contemporaneous with Northern and Southern dynasties

Sui dynasty

Sui dynasty

Other regimes contemporaneous with Sui dynasty

Tang dynasty

Tang dynasty

Wu Zhou

Tang dynasty (restored)

Bohai

Nanzhao

Yan

Tibetan Empire

Kingdom of Khotan

Other regimes contemporaneous with Tang dynasty

Five Dynasties and Ten Kingdoms

Later Liang

Later Tang

Later Jin

Later Han

Later Zhou

Former Shu

Yang Wu

Ma Chu

Wuyue

Min

Southern Han

Jingnan

Later Shu

Southern Tang

Northern Han

Qi

Dachanghe

Datianxing

Dayining

Former Jin

Yan

Other regimes contemporaneous with Five Dynasties and Ten Kingdoms

Liao dynasty

Liao dynasty

Dongdan

Ding'an

Xingliao

Northern Liao

Western Liao

Other regimes contemporaneous with Liao dynasty

Song dynasty

Northern Song

Southern Song

Former Dali

Dazhong Kingdom

Later Dali

Ziqi Kingdom

Other regimes contemporaneous with Song dynasty

Western Xia

Jin dynasty

Jin dynasty

Eastern Liao

Later Liao

Eastern Xia

Other regimes contemporaneous with Jin dynasty

Yuan dynasty

Yuan dynasty

Northern Yuan

Tianwan

Zhang Zhou

Han Song

Chen Han

Ming Xia

Other regimes contemporaneous with Yuan dynasty

Ming dynasty

Ming dynasty

Southern Ming

Shun dynasty

Kingdom of Tungning

Other regimes contemporaneous with Ming dynasty

Qing dynasty

Later Jin

Qing dynasty

Wu Zhou

Taiping Heavenly Kingdom

Other regimes contemporaneous with Qing dynasty

Republic of China

Republic of China

The Republic of China officially uses the Republic of China calendar. While not an era name, the Republic of China calendar is based on the era name system of Imperial China. The Republic of China calendar was the official calendar of mainland China between 1912 CE and 1949 CE, and has been in official use in Taiwan since 1945 CE.

Other regimes contemporaneous with Republic of China

Unknown era names
This is a list of individuals who proclaimed era names, but the exact era names are not known.

See also
 Chinese calendar
 Republic of China calendar
 Chinese era name
 Japanese era name
 Korean era name
 Vietnamese era name
 North Korean calendar
 Regnal year

References

 
History of Imperial China
Chinese calendars